KCMG may refer to

 KC Motorgroup, based in Hong Kong, China
 Knight Commander of the Order of St Michael and St George, British honour
 KCMG-LP, radio station in New Mexico, USA
 KCMG, callsign 1997-2001 of Los Angeles radio station KKLQ (FM)